Moule may refer to:
 Le Moule, a commune in the French overseas département of Guadeloupe

People 
 Aaron Moule (born 1977), former professional rugby league footballer
 Alf Moule (1894–1973), English cricketer
 Arthur Christopher Moule (1873–1957), British sinologist
 Brad Moules, rugby league player
 C. F. D. Moule (1908–2007), an Anglican priest and theologian
 Harry Moule (1921–2016), English former cricketer
 Henry Moule (1801–1880), priest in the Church of England, inventor of the dry earth closet, and father of eight sons:
 Henry Joseph Moule (1825–1904), Watercolour artist
 George Evans Moule (1828–1912), Anglican missionary in China
 Frederick John Moule (1830–1900), Vicar of St Peters Church, Yaxley
 Horatio Mosley Moule (1832–1873), Friend of Thomas Hardy
 Charles Walter Moule (1834–1921), university lecturer and librarian
 Arthur Evans Moule (1836–1918), English missionary to China
 Christopher Cooper Moule (1838–1839)
 Handley Carr Glyn Moule (1841–1920), Bishop of Durham from 1901 to 1920
 Jack Moule (born 1994), young professional jet skier
 John Stuart Moule (born 1971), Warden of Radley College, former Head Master of Bedford School
 John Moule (politician) (1845–1912), wheat merchant and politician in South Australia
 Ken Moule (1925–1986), English jazz pianist
 Thomas Moule (1784–1851), English antiquarian, writer on heraldry and map-maker
 William Moule (1858–1939), Australian lawyer and politician

Moules may refer to:
 Mussels in French as in :
 Éclade des Moules, a seafood bake often held on the beaches outside of La Rochelle, France
 Moules-frites, mussels and French-fried potatoes

See also
 Moulé, a village in the Diébougou Department of Bougouriba Province in south-western Burkina Faso
 , a village in the commune of Arles, Bouches-du-Rhône department, France